Monitorul de Cluj is a Romanian language daily newspaper published in Cluj-Napoca. It was first published in 26 June 1998. It is currently published by SC Monitorul de Cluj SRL, private owned company from Cluj-Napoca. Monitorul de Cluj / monitorulcj.ro it's part of the media group Monitorul-Mesagerul, which is publishing the weeklies Mesagerul de Sibiu (print and on-line), Monitorul de Aries (print edition only), Monitorul de Medias (print and on-line) and Mesagerul de Alba (on-line).

monitorulcj.ro  is the most read news portal in [Cluj], the online extension of the daily monitorulcj.ro (Monitorul de Cluj), which has been published in Cluj since 1998. monitorulcj.ro publishes daily, in real time (24 hours a day), 7 days a week), news, reports, interviews, analyzes and investigations about all the events in Cluj County, in Romania and around the world.

External links
Official website
Official Facebook page

Newspapers published in Cluj-Napoca
Publications with year of establishment missing